Taylor Hunt Trensch (born May 3, 1989) is an American stage and film actor.

Early life and education
Trensch was born in Tampa, Florida.

He began his education at Howard W. Blake High School where he studied theatre under Eric Davis, James Rayfield, and Jennie Eisenhower. During his senior year, Trensch was awarded a college scholarship from the Florida State Thespian Society. Trensch graduated in 2007.

He was then accepted to Elon University's musical theatre program and attended for two years.

Career
In the summer of 2008 Trensch joined the acting company at the Lake Dillon Theatre in Dillon, Colorado. He performed The Rocky Horror Show, Little Shop of Horrors, Into the Woods, Cabaret, and Rabbit Hole in repertory.

In 2009, during his sophomore year at Elon University, Trensch was cast as Moritz Stiefel in the first national tour of Spring Awakening. For his portrayal of Moritz, Trensch won the 2009 Denver Post Ovation Award for Best Supporting Actor in a National Touring Production as well as the Best Individual Performance honor from BroadwayWorld.

Trensch then appeared as Dwayne Hoover in the world premiere of William Finn and James Lapine's Little Miss Sunshine at the La Jolla Playhouse Mandell Weiss Theatre in early 2011.

Trensch made his Broadway debut as Boq in Wicked on January 24, 2012, temporarily replacing Etai BenShlomo. The role was offered to him after auditioning for Pasek and Paul's musical Dogfight, which was also being directed by Wicked helmer Joe Mantello.

He performed in the off-Broadway revivals of Rent (as Gordon, Waiter, and others) and Bare (as Peter) at New World Stages shortly thereafter. That same year, Trensch read the role of Jack in a developmental workshop for the film adaptation of Into the Woods.

On April 11, 2013 he opened the Broadway transfer of the Royal Shakespeare Company's Matilda the Musical as Michael Wormwood and remained in the role through June 8. 2014.

Trensch played the lead role of Christopher Boone, sharing the role with Alex Sharp, in the original Broadway production of The Curious Incident of the Dog in the Night-time. It opened at the Ethel Barrymore Theatre on October 5, 2014 and he continued in the role until September 12, 2015. 

In January 2016 Trensch acted in the world premiere of Samuel D. Hunter's Clarkston at the Dallas Theatre Center. Then, In July, he performed the role of Tyler Clementi in the world premiere of Craig Carnelia and Joe Tracz's Poster Boy at the Williamstown Theatre Festival.

Trensch was cast as Barnaby Tucker in the Broadway revival of Hello, Dolly! that began previews March 15, 2017 and opened on April 20 at the Shubert Theatre. He left the show on January 14, 2018 along with fellow co-stars Bette Midler, David Hyde Pierce, and Beanie Feldstein.

On February 6, 2018 Trensch took over the titular role in Dear Evan Hansen at the Music Box Theatre on Broadway. He left the production after a year and was replaced by Andrew Barth Feldman.

From November 5, 2019 until the Broadway shutdown on March 12, 2020, Trensch appeared opposite Ed Harris in To Kill a Mockingbird as Dill Harris. It was his third Broadway show at the Shubert Theatre.

Trensch will next step into the role of Mordred in the Lincoln Center revival of Camelot, reuniting with Bartlett Sher and Aaron Sorkin. It opens on April 13, 2023 at the Vivian Beaumont Theatre and also stars Andrew Burnap, Phillipa Soo, and Jordan Donica.

On television, Trensch has guest starred on Evil and Law & Order: SVU in addition to voicing characters for Nickelodeon's Nella the Princess Knight and Netflix's Archibald's Next Big Thing. He has also played supporting roles in the independent features Things Like This and Your Monster.

Personal life
Trensch is openly gay.

Theatre credits

•

Television/Film credits

Discography

Cast recordings
 Matilda the Musical – Original Broadway Cast Recording (2013)
 Hello, Dolly! – 2017 Broadway Cast of Hello Dolly! (2017)
 Dear Evan Hansen [Deluxe Album] – Original Broadway Cast Recording (2018)

Singles
 "Disappear (Acoustic)" (2018)
 "Obvious" (2018)

As featured artist
 Drafts: The Music and Lyrics of Alexander Sage Oyen, Vol. 1 (2012)
 Bare Naked by Lynne Shankel (2017)
 ALBUM by Joe Iconis (2022)

Awards and nominations

See also
 LGBT culture in New York City
 List of self-identified LGBTQ New Yorkers

References

External links
 
 

1989 births
21st-century American male actors
American male musical theatre actors
American male stage actors
American people of German descent
Elon University alumni
American gay actors
American gay musicians
American LGBT singers
LGBT people from Florida
Living people
Male actors from Florida
Male actors from Tampa, Florida
20th-century American LGBT people
21st-century American LGBT people